My Brother, My Sisters is a one-act ballet created by Kenneth MacMillan in 1974 for the Stuttgart Ballet, under the title Mein Bruder, meine Schwestern. The music is by Arnold Schoenberg (Five Pieces for Orchestra, Op. 16) and Anton Webern (Five Pieces for Orchestra, Op. 10 and Six Pieces for Orchestra, Op. 6). The story is loosely based on the lives of the Brontë family. The designer was Yolanda Sonnabend, who had first collaborated with him on 1963's Symphony.

The first performance was on 21 May 1978, at Stuttgart. MacMillan recreated the work for the Royal Ballet in April 1980 at the Royal Opera House, Covent Garden.

Original cast
 Birgit Keil
 Richard Cragun
 Lucia Montagnon
 Reid Anderson
 Jean Allenby
 Sylviane Bayard
 Hilde Koch

Notes

Ballets by Kenneth MacMillan
Ballets to the music of Arnold Schoenberg
Ballets to the music of Anton von Webern
1978 ballet premieres
Ballets designed by Yolanda Sonnabend